Caroline Ford may refer to:
Caroline Ford (academic), American academic
Caroline Ford (beauty queen), American beauty queen
Caroline Ford (actress) (born 1988), English actress
Caroline Ford (medical researcher), Australian scientist